Howardville Wesleyan Church is a church located  north of the town of Floyd, Iowa. The church has served its community for over 150 years and is the oldest church still holding weekly services in the Iowa/Minnesota District of the Wesleyan Church.

Early years
The following comes word for word from the type-written "History of the Howardville Church" which is on constant display at the church to this day:
One of the first acts of group of settlers, who grouped themselves around the community of Howardville, was to begin a Sunday school and in 1855 just one year after the first settlement was made in this area, "religious services were held in the house of Elbert Howard; Rev. Samuel Smith, of the Wesleyan Methodist persuasion, was the preacher.

The Howardville Wesleyan Methodist Church had its beginning in the very early history of Iowa. The Sunday School was formerly organized in 1856 and for many years met in the Howardville school. The church was organized in 1859 when a convention was called by Reverend George I. Cummins to examine these who wished to organize a church society. The following persons related their Christian experience and were received as Charter members of the church:

Charter Members
 Lucian M. Foster
 Sarah M. Foster
 Betsy Bennett
 Mary Ann Caswell
 Sophia Foster
This Church was received into the Wesleyan Methodist Connection of Churches.

References

External links 
 
 

19th-century Methodist church buildings
Buildings and structures in Floyd County, Iowa
Wesleyan Church
Methodist churches in Iowa